Henry Andrews Mucci (March 4, 1909 – April 20, 1997) was a colonel in the United States Army Rangers. In January 1945, during World War II, he led a force of 121 Army Rangers on a mission which rescued 513 survivors of the Bataan Death March from Cabanatuan Prison Camp, despite being heavily outnumbered. It is widely considered the most successful rescue mission in the history of the United States military.

Youth 

Mucci was born in Bridgeport, Connecticut, to parents who had emigrated from Sicily, Italy.

Today, a section of the United States Embassy in Rome, Italy is named in Mucci's honor.

Henry came from a family of 10 siblings.  Two of his brothers also served in the Army and Navy during the Second World War, while his sisters worked at the Veterans of Foreign Wars in America and made bazookas in factories.

He enrolled at the United States Military Academy in West Point, New York, graduating 246th of 275 in his class in May 1936. While at West Point he participated in lacrosse and, due to his early years growing up with horses, was on the equestrian team.

Military service

World War II
In February 1943, the US Sixth Army put Mucci in charge of the 98th Field Artillery Battalion, previously a mule-drawn pack artillery unit. Mucci announced that the Battalion was being converted from Field Artillery to Rangers, downsized the battalion from 1,000 men to 500, and held a training camp in New Guinea where he utilized commando type training techniques for over a year. Thus, Mucci created a new battalion of Army Rangers. Mucci survived the attack on Pearl Harbor on December 7, 1941.  During the liberation of the Philippines, General Walter Kreuger and one of his staff officers, Col. Horton White (6th Army Group's G-2), chose Mucci to head the liberation of the Cabanatuan Prison Camp due to both the difficulty and the peculiar needs of such a mission.

In January 1945, Mucci led 120 Army Rangers in liberating the Cabanatuan Prison Camp with the loss of only two men killed in action.  The raid was supported by some 250 Filipino guerrillas, many of whom were unarmed, who guided the Rangers through Japanese held territory and held off Japanese reinforcements while the American Rangers freed the POWs.

For Mucci's actions in the raid he was personally awarded the Distinguished Service Cross by General of the Army Douglas MacArthur.

Postwar Life
Mucci returned home as a national hero in his home town of Bridgeport, Connecticut.

In 1947, he married Marion Fountain, with whom he had three children.

He ran for Congress in 1946 but was defeated. He became the President of Bridgeport Lincoln Mercury as well as becoming an oil representative in India.

In November 1974, the portion of Route 25 between Bridgeport and Newtown was named the Col. Henry A. Mucci Highway.

Colonel Mucci died at age 88 in Melbourne, Florida, on April 20, 1997, as the result of a stroke, being a complication of a fractured hip sustained at age 86, while swimming in rough surf near his home.

The raid on Cabanatuan was depicted in the 2005 film The Great Raid, which featured actor Benjamin Bratt depicting Mucci, Bratt bearing a remarkable facial resemblance to Mucci.

Military decorations and awards

Distinguished Service Cross 

Citation:
The President of the United States of America, authorized by Act of Congress, July 9, 1918, takes pleasure in presenting the Distinguished Service Cross to Lieutenant Colonel (Infantry) Henry Andrews Mucci (ASN: 0-20374), United States Army, for extraordinary heroism in connection with military operations against an armed enemy while serving with the 6th Ranger Infantry Battalion, in action against enemy forces on 30 January 1945, during the rescue of Allied Prisoners of War from the Cabanatuan Prison Camp in the Philippine Islands. Colonel Mucci was charged with the rescue of several hundred Americans held prisoner by the enemy. It was believed that the enemy would kill or remove the prisoners when our attack was launched in that area. Colonel Mucci promptly assembled a rescue team composed of Ranger Infantry, Scouts, guerrillas and Filipino volunteers. On 28 January, he secured guides, and moved to rendezvous with the Scouts, who reported that three thousand enemy, with some tanks, were in the stockade area. He ordered the attack at dark on 30 January. The attack was launched, and within five minutes the Rangers and Scouts entered the camp, and killed the guards. Ten minutes later all prisoners were out of the camp, and were being taken to carts previously assembled. En route, our troops encountered a force about eight hundred enemy, attacked and killed three hundred. Eight enemy tanks attacking the convoy were held off by a quickly established roadblock. The convoy proceeded through the enemy-held area and completed the evacuation of the released prisoners. Colonel Mucci's gallant leadership, superior professional ability and outstanding personal courage contributed immeasurably to the brilliantly executed rescue of American imprisoned by the enemy. Lieutenant Colonel Mucci's intrepid leadership, personal bravery and zealous devotion to duty exemplify the highest traditions of the military forces of the United States and reflect great credit upon himself, his unit, and the United States Army.

Commendations
Henry Mucci received the following military awards:

Notes

References

External links

Medal of Honor Recipients and Nominees on Film

1909 births
1997 deaths
United States Army personnel of World War II
American people of Italian descent
People from Melbourne, Florida
Recipients of the Distinguished Service Cross (United States)
Recipients of the Legion of Merit
Recipients of the Silver Star
Attack on Pearl Harbor
Recipients of the Soldier's Medal
United States Army colonels
United States Army Rangers
United States Military Academy alumni
Military personnel from Bridgeport, Connecticut